Australian Taekwondo, also known as AUS TKD, is the governing body for the sport of taekwondo in Australia.

History
Taekwondo Australia (TA) and Sports Taekwondo Australia (STA) were once two separate organisations for taekwondo in Australia. In 2013 the two bodies signed an agreement which culminated in a merger in 2014. The new board had an equal number of members from each organisation, with an independent chairperson.

In 2022, Australian Taekwondo announced the opening of a new "high performance hub" for elite taekwondo athletes in Melbourne, co-funded by the Australian Institute of Sport.

Structure
Sports Taekwondo Australia is affiliated to the Oceania Taekwondo Union and World Taekwondo and is recognised by the Australian Olympic Committee.

Functions
Australian Taekwondo stages the Taekwondo National Championships. The 2023 event is due to be staged in Brisbane.

References

External links
 
 

Sports organizations established in 2014
2014 establishments in Australia
Sports governing bodies in Australia
Taekwondo in Australia
National members of World Taekwondo
National Taekwondo teams